Live Innocence – The Power & the Glory is a DVD released by heavy metal band Saxon in 2003. This DVD has combined two VHS videos released in the late 80's: Live Innocence released in 1986 and Power & The Glory, The Video Anthology released in 1989.

Much of the Live Innocence performance features songs taken from the album Innocence Is No Excuse released the previous year and which was hailed as their best work since the classic Denim and Leather - here they perform the hard rocking "Play It Loud" from Denim and Leather. The promo clips for "Back on the Streets" and "Rocking Again" are also included at the beginning and end of the concert footage, as well as a thrashing medley of four of their biggest album tracks "Heavy Metal Thunder", "Stand Up and Be Counted", "Taking Your Chances", and "Warrior".

The Video Anthology follows on the DVD featuring each of the video promos that accompanied the singles between 1983 and 1988. There are 7 UK chart hits here which helped Saxon attain 61 weeks in the UK charts during the 80's, including "Power and the Glory", "Northern Lady" and "Ride Like the Wind". Saxon also had 8 top 40 albums during the 80's.

Tracklisting

Additional notes
Region Code: 1 (US and Canada)

Saxon (band) video albums
2003 video albums
EMI Records video albums